Vulvar tumors are those neoplasms of the vulva. Vulvar and vaginal neoplasms make up a small percentage (3%) of female genital cancers. They can be benign or malignant (vulvar cancer). Vulvar neoplasms are divided into cystic or solid lesions and other mixed types. Vulvar cancers are  those malignant neoplasms that originate from vulvar epithelium, while vulvar sarcomas develop from non-epithelial cells such as bone, cartilage, fat, muscle, blood vessels, or other connective or supportive tissue. Epithelial and mesenchymal tissue are the origin of vulvar tumors.

Malignant vulvar neoplasms makes up 6% of all reproductive organ cancer and 0.7% of the total cancers in women in the United States. One out of every 333 women will develop vulvar cancer. In the United States, vulvar cancer accounts for nearly 6% of cancers of the female reproductive organs and 0.7% of all cancers in women.  In 2018, there were 5,496 women diagnosed with cancer of the vulva and 1,316 women who died from it. Malignant vulvar tumors can develop in the inner edges of the labia majora, labia minora, clitoris or in the Bartholin glands. Research in preventing vulvar cancers includes investigations into the use of oncogenes, tumor suppressor genes, drug treatments, surgery, radiation therapy, chemotherapy, and lymph node mapping.

Epithelial neoplasms

Squamous tumors precursors 

 Squamous cell carcinoma not otherwise specified
 Basal cell carcinoma
 Squamous intraepithelial neoplasia
 Benign squamous lesions

Glandular Tumors 

Paget disease 
Bartholin gland Tumors: carcinomas, adenoma and adenomyoma
Tumor arising from specialized ano-genital mammary-like glands
Adenocarcinoma of Shene gland origin
Adenocarcinoma of other types
Adenoma of minor vestibular glands
Mixed Tumors of the vulva
Tumors of skin appendage origin

Soft tissue Tumors 

Embryonal rhabdomyosarcoma (sarcoma botryoides) 
Leiomyosarcoma 
Fibrous histiocytoma
Proximal epithelioid sarcoma 
Alveolar soft part sarcoma
Liposarcoma 
Dermatofibrosarcoma protuberans 
Deep angiomyxoma
Superficial angiomyxoma
Angiomyofibroblastoma 
Cellular angiofibroma
Leiomyoma
Granular cell Tumor

Melanocytic Tumors 

 Malignant melanoma
 Congenital melanocytic naevus
 Acquired melanocytic naevus
 Blue naevus
 Atypical melanocytic naevus of genital type
 Dysplastic melanocytic naevus

Other

 Yolk sac Tumor
 Merkel cell Tumor
 Peripheral primitive neuroectodermal Tumor/Ewing sarcoma

Haematopoietic and lymphoid Tumors 

 Malignant lymphoma
 Leukemia

Secondary tumors

Benign cystic lesions 
 Bartholin duct cysts and abscesses
 Skene duct cyst
 Mucinous cyst
 Ciliated cyst
 Gartner duct cyst
 Cyst of the Canal of Nuck
 Perineal hernia

Solid lesions 
 Epithelial lesions
 Acrochordons, fibroepithelial polyps
 Nevus
 Seborrheic keratosis
 Adenosis
 Syringoma
 Hidradenoma papilliferum
 Anogential mammary-like glands

Mesenchymal and other subcutaneious lesions 
 Endometriosis
 Hemangioma
 Fibroma
 Lipoma
 Granular cell tumor
 Leiomyoma
 Angiomyofibroblastoma
 Aggressive angiomyxoma
 Teratoma
 Osteochondroma
 Neurofibroma
 Schwannoma
 Perineal nodular induration
 Epidermal inclusion cyst

See also 

 Urethral caruncle
 Vaginal cysts
 Vaginal intraepithelial neoplasia

References

External links

Neoplasms